Nashville Tears is the fifth studio album by British singer-songwriter Rumer. It was released on 14 August 2020 on Cooking Vinyl Records and debuted at number one on the Americana Album UK Charts and at number 17 on the UK Albums Chart.

The album's producer, Fred Mollin, sent Rumer a demo recording of "Oklahoma Stray", written by Hugh Prestwood, which made such an impression on her that she decided Prestwood's songs would become the sole focus of her recording project.

Track listing
Standard Edition

Charts

References

2020 albums
Rumer (musician) albums